For information on all University of Central Arkansas sports, see Central Arkansas Bears and Sugar Bears
 For information about the Central Arkansas women's team, see Central Arkansas Sugar Bears basketball.

The Central Arkansas Bears basketball team represents the University of Central Arkansas (UCA) in NCAA Division I men's basketball competition. UCA currently plays in the ASUN Conference, which it joined in 2021 after 15 seasons as a member of the Southland Conference. The Bears play home games at the Farris Center located on the UCA campus in Conway, Arkansas and are currently led by interim head coach Anthony Boone.

The school was formerly known as Arkansas State Teachers School and the State College of Arkansas. Prior to competition at the NCAA Division I level, the Bears also competed in the NAIA and NCAA Division II.

Postseason

NCAA Division II Tournament

NAIA Tournament 
The Bears have appeared in 15 NAIA tournaments. Their combined record is 13–16.

CBI results 
The Bears have appeared in the College Basketball Invitational (CBI) one time. Their record is 1–1.

Notable players
 Scottie Pippen - Member of the Naismith Memorial Basketball Hall of Fame

References

External links
 Official Website